Abdul Majid Thuneibat (5 October 1945 – 16 November 2022) was a Jordanian lawyer and politician.

Thuneibat died on 16 November 2022, at the age of 77.

References

1945 births
2022 deaths
21st-century Jordanian politicians
Damascus University alumni
People from Karak Governorate
Jordanian Muslim Brotherhood members
Members of the Senate of Jordan